Sir John Stuart, 4th Baronet (c. 1752 – 4 December 1821) was a Scottish MP in the Parliament of Great Britain. His surname was Wishart-Belsches until Oct 1797. He was MP for Kincardineshire between 1797–1806 and 1802-06 as Sir John Stuart.

Biography
He was the only son of William Belsches, Esq., (by his wife and cousin Emilia, only surviving child of John Belsches, of Invermay, by his wife Mary Stuart (died 1807), 2nd daughter of Sir George Wishart, 1st Baronet, so created 17 June 1706, with remainder to the heirs of his body).

Stuart assumed the Wishart Baronetcy in 1777 in dubious circumstances on the death of his great-uncle, Sir William Stuart, 2nd Baronet after taking legal advice, although it was not disputed in his lifetime. He also assumed the surname of Stuart in lieu of Wishart-Belsches by Royal licence in October 1797. Now it is accepted that women can be baronets his mother is today considered to have rightfully been the 3rd Baronet even though her son was already using the title.

He was elected M.P. for Kincardineshire as above and became a Baron of the Exchequer in Scotland from 1807 until his death.

He married, on 9 November 1775, Lady Jane Leslie, the eldest daughter of David Melville, 6th Earl of Leven. She died on 28 October 1829. They had a daughter, Williamina Stuart (died 5 December 1810; married Sir William Forbes, 7th Baronet).

On his death with no heir the Wishart baronetcy of Clifton Hall, Edinburgh became dormant.

References

External links 
 

Year of birth uncertain
1821 deaths
Members of the Parliament of Great Britain for Scottish constituencies
British MPs 1796–1800
Members of the Parliament of the United Kingdom for Scottish constituencies
UK MPs 1802–1806
UK MPs 1801–1802
Baronets in the Baronetage of Nova Scotia